Jay Ralph Wells III (born June 5, 1940) is a former Republican member of the Pennsylvania House of Representatives.

References

Republican Party members of the Pennsylvania House of Representatives
Living people
1940 births